The  was a title owned and promoted by the Wrestle-1 promotion. The title was originally created in 2006 in All Japan Pro Wrestling (AJPW), with the inaugural champions crowned on December 15, 2006. The "F" in F-1 stands for "fake". In Japanese the title's name includes the katakana term for "championship", derived from the English language instead of the more common kanji term  that was used in the name of the title when it was still owned by AJPW.

Being a professional wrestling championship, the title is won as a result of a match with a predetermined outcome. The last champions were Keiji Mutoh and Kannazuki.

History
The F-1 Tag Team Championship was an unofficial tag team title in All Japan Pro Wrestling that apparently was not recognized by the promotion. It's more of a comedy title as matches are a mix of regular wrestling and impromptu standup comedy routines involving the wrestlers. It was created by Mutoh in December 2006, and he and Japanese comedian Kannazuki were the first to win the titles.

In May 2013, 11 wrestlers including Keiji Mutoh left All Japan Pro Wrestling, and established a new promotion, Wrestle-1. With the departure of its creator, the F-1 Tag Team Championship was abandoned.

On August 30, 2015 it was announced that the title was going to be revived and new champions would be crowned on October 9. At Wrestle-1 Tour 2015 Fan Appreciation Day, Keiji Mutoh and Kannazuki defeated Manabu Soya and Sugi-chan to win the titles for their second time, starting their first reign as the F-1 Tag Team Champions in Wrestle-1.

On February 29, 2020, Wrestle-1 announced that they would be closing down following their final event on April 1, thus deactivating all championship titles.

Reigns

By team

By wrestler

Footnotes

References

External links
 
Wrestle-1 on YouTube 

All Japan Pro Wrestling championships
Wrestle-1 championships
Tag team wrestling championships